Madame de Sade is a 1965 play written by Yukio Mishima. It was first published in English, translated by Donald Keene by Grove Press and is currently out of print.

Madame de Sade is a historical fiction play written by Mishima Yukio and published in 1965. The play is based on the life of Renée de Sade, the wife of the notorious Marquis de Sade.  It details the struggles of Renée, her family, and acquaintances during the Marquis' various periods of incarceration. All the onstage characters are female. After reading about Marquis and Madame de Sade, Mishima questioned why Renée waited until the Marquis was finally let out of prison to leave him.

In March 2009 London's Donmar Warehouse staged a production at Wyndhams Theatre directed by Michael Grandage. It starred Rosamund Pike (in the title role) and Judi Dench as her mother, Madame De Montreuil. Frances Barber, Deborah Findlay, Jenny Galloway and Fiona Button co-starred.

Judi Dench was forced to miss several performances after she tripped over the stage-doors and severely sprained her ankle and thus her understudy, Marjorie Hayward, took over the role. When Dench did return four days after the injury, she performed with a walking stick.

Characters

RENEE, 
	the Marquise de Sade

MADAME DE MONTREUIL,
	Renée's Mother

ANNE,
	Renée's younger sister

BARONESSE DE SIMIANE

COMTESSE DE SAINT-FOND

CHARLOTTE,
	Madame de Montreuil's housekeeper
	
(Madame de Sade, p. iii)

Characters

	According to Mishima, every character is symbolic of some form of human nature, thus the play functions as an allegory. He describes them as follows. Madame de Sade (Renée) represents wifely devotion; Madame de Montreuil is law, society, and morality, Anne (Renée's younger sister) shows feminine guilelessness and lack of principles; Madame de Simaine for religion; Madame de Saint-Fond for carnal desires, and Charlotte (the house keeper) for the common people.(pg. 107 Author's Postface Madame de Sade)

Plot

Act one
The first act takes place at the salon in Paris, France at Madame de Montreuil's house, in Autumn of 1772. In this act we are introduced to all the characters and are given a glimpse at their personalities. Act One is also the first and only act where all six characters appear on the stage, (Baronesse de  Simiane is absent from Act Two, and Comtesse de Saint-Fond is absent from Act Three). The scene opens with Simiane and Saint-Fond waiting in the saloon after being summoned by Madame de Montreuil. We soon learn that Montreuil has asked them to her home for a favor. She asks them to use their influences to get her son-in-law, the Marquis de Sade, out of prison. Both ladies pledge their help, Simiane using her influential contacts in the church and Saint-Fond her web of lovers and bed fellows. 

	Soon Renee arrives and we learn that the Marquis has escaped from prison and been on the run for a few months. After a brief discussion the Comtesse and Baronesse excuse themselves, leaving Renee and her mother to discuss the matter of the Marquis. Renée begs her mother to save her husband from imprisonment and the pair get in an argument. Montreuil demands to know the location of the Marquis but Renee denies having any knowledge of his whereabouts. The argument ends when the stress takes its toll on Renee and she grows faint. 

	As Montreuil and Renee leave the stage, Anne the sister and Charlotte the house keeper enter the scene. Anne appears to be expressing an unwillingness to see her sister to Charlotte right before her mother walks back on stage. Anne reveals that she has just returned from a trip to Venice, Italy with a friend she does not immediately name. Upon further probing by her mother she reveals her travelling companion to be none other than her brother-in-law the Marquis de Sade. Anne then proceeds to tell her mother that she was having an affair with the Marquis and that Renee knew of both the affair and the Marquis' location. 

	After stumbling on the news of her son-in-law's infidelity with Anne Montreuil is outraged. After getting Anne to divulge the Marquis' location Montreuil immediately has Charlotte write three letters. The first two are to Comtesse de Saint-Fond and Baronesse de Simiane telling them to cease their endeavors on de Sade's behalf; the third letter is to the King of France. Montreuil prepares to have the letters delivered and Act One ends.

Act Two
	The second act takes place six years later in September 1778. Anne and Renee meet onstage and Anne reveals she has a letter. After a light-hearted struggle between the sisters Renee wrestles the letter away from Anne. The letter announces that Marquis de Sade was retried, given a lesser sentence and is to be released from jail, Renee becomes ecstatic. The two women begin to discuss the rift which has developed over the past six years between Renée and their mother and how Renee now sees that her mother has begun helping de Sade once more. 

	The women then go to their mother and the three of them begin debating the true nature of the Marquis based on their understandings. When Renee begins expressing a desire to return home and prepare the Manor at La Coste for the arrival of her husband, Anne and Montreuil begin exchanging glances. Montreuil persuades Renee to stay with her awhile longer and Renee continues to praise her mother for helping free the Marquis. Montreuil tries to impress upon Renee the need behind behaving morally and in a socially acceptable manner. When Montreuil begins to denounce the Marquis de Sade, Renee and Anne jump to his defense and Anne recounts her trip to Venice. As the women continue to argue Charlotte enters the room and informs them that the Comtesse de Saint-Fond has come to pay a visit. Almost moments after her arrival is announced Saint-Fond enters the room. 

	The Comtesse Saint-Fond explains that she had a revelation and had to see Montreuil immediately to inform her. Saint-Fond begins to inform the ladies gathered onstage of her latest exploits into the world of the erotic and profane. She recently participated in a black mass and was used as the altar. During the mass she came to the conclusion that she was no different from the Marquis, "...I understood who Alfonse was." ... "Alfonse was myself." When Montreuil and Anne begin to ridicule Saint-Fond the Comtesse asks Renée about the date of written on the announcement of Alphonse's release. Renee realizes that the date was a month and a half before her mother had informed her of the announcement. An argument breaks out between Renee, her mother, and Anne with the Comtesse egging Renée on. As the argument progresses, Anne asks Saint-Fond if she'd like to continue her walk; the pair leave together, leaving Renee and Montreuil to continue fighting. Renée's mother desperately begs her to leave the Marquis and Renee refuses. Montreuil informs Renée that she had a private investigator spy on the Marquis and Renee. The investigator saw Renée taking part in some of the Marquis' erotic S&M activities and being abused. Renée denounces her mother; Montreuil tells her daughter that staying with the Marquis de Sade will make her a pariah. Renée tells her mother that when things were good and Alphonse's status gave her family influence she was perfectly content with the marriage, but when Alphonse was in trouble and his reputation was no longer helping her family she denounced him.  The more Renée denounces her mother the more upset Montreuil becomes, until she is finally pushed over the edge.  

Montreuil: "Renée, I'll slap your face!" 
Renée: "Go ahead! But what would you do if I curled up with pleasure at being slapped?" 
Montreuil: "Ohh...when you say that, your face..."  
Renée (takes a step forward): "Yes what about my face?" 
Montreuil (raises her voice): "...looks like Alphonse's. I'm afraid." 
Renee (laughs): "Madame de Saint-Fond had a word for it --- 'Alphonse is myself'!"

And Act II ends.

Act Three
By the end of the play everyone has given up something or made some sort of sacrifice. Madame de Sade plans to join a convent; Anne leaves her home and family and moves to Italy with her husband; Madame de Simaine has also joined a convent; Madame de Saint-Fond is trampled in a crowd who parades her dead body reverently through the streets; and Madame Montreuil is losing both her daughters (though perhaps not permanently) who are moving away. Charlotte is the only one who gains by the end, in that she has lost her meek and submissive demeanor.

Performance history

Madame de Sades first performance was on November 14, 1965 at Kinokuniya Hall, Tokyo. It was directed by Takeo Matsuura and produced by the New Literature Theatre. Yatsuko Tannami played Renée; Yoshi Minami played Madam de Montreuil; Anne was played by Hideko Muramatsu; Baronesse de Simiane was played by Natsuko Kahara; Comtesse de Saint-Fond was played by Miki Masaki; and Charlotte was played by Junko Miyauchi.

Ingmar Bergman staged the play at the Royal Dramatic Theatre in 1989 with Stina Ekblad as the main character Renée, Marie Richardson as her sister and Anita Björk as their mother. The director made a TV-version of the setting in 1992.

In 2008 Madame de Sade was performed in France and received glowing praise from critics.

In April 2009 Madame de Sade was performed at the Donmer West End in London and received mixed reviews from critics. Rosamund Pike played Renee; Judi Dench played Madame de Montreuil; and Frances Barber played Comtesse de Saint-Fond.

References 

1965 plays
Plays by Yukio Mishima
Works about the Marquis de Sade